Ontario is a train station in Ontario, California, served by Amtrak, the national railroad passenger system in the United States. This station is situated along Union Pacific's Alhambra Subdivision connecting to LAUPT and points East towards New Orleans. There is a thrice-weekly service provided in each direction by the Sunset Limited and the Texas Eagle. The station consists of a covered, open-air pavilion built by the city in 1991.

Of the 73 California stations served by Amtrak, Ontario was the 70th-busiest in fiscal year 2019, boarding or detraining an average of approximately 11 passengers daily (though the station does not receive daily service).

See also 
 Ontario–East station

References

External links

Ontario Amtrak station information
Ontario Amtrak Station (USA Rail Guide -- Train Web)

Amtrak station
Amtrak stations in San Bernardino County, California
Former Southern Pacific Railroad stations in California